Fred Perry and Dorothy Round were the defending champions, but Perry was ineligible to compete after turning professional at the end of the 1936 season. Round partnered with Don Butler but lost in the third round to Don Budge and Alice Marble.

Budge and Marble defeated Yvon Petra and Simonne Mathieu in the final, 6–4, 6–1 to win the mixed doubles tennis title at the 1937 Wimbledon Championships.

Seeds

  Don Budge /  Alice Marble (champions)
  Yvon Petra /  Simonne Mathieu (final)
  Frank Wilde /  Mary Whitmarsh (fourth round)
  Norman Farquharson /  Kay Stammers (third round)

Draw

Finals

Top half

Section 1

Section 2

Section 3

Section 4

The nationality of GE Bean is unknown.

Bottom half

Section 5

Section 6

Section 7

Section 8

The nationality of Miss M Parr is unknown.

References

External links

X=Mixed Doubles
Wimbledon Championship by year – Mixed doubles